Dennis Wade Awtrey (born February 22, 1948) is a retired American professional basketball player.  A 6'10" center from Santa Clara University, Awtrey was drafted by the NBA's Philadelphia 76ers in 1970.  He played in the league for twelve seasons, spending time with the 76ers, Chicago Bulls, Phoenix Suns, Boston Celtics, Seattle SuperSonics, and Portland Trail Blazers.  Awtrey had his finest season in 1974–1975, when he averaged 9.9 points and 8.6 rebounds as a member of the Suns. Awtrey was also known for once having punched Kareem Abdul-Jabbar in the jaw. In 2012, Awtrey moved to Manzanita, Oregon, where he now operates a bed-and-breakfast.

References

External links

1948 births
Living people
American men's basketball players
Basketball players from Los Angeles
Boston Celtics players
Centers (basketball)
Chicago Bulls players
New Orleans Jazz expansion draft picks
People from Hollywood, Los Angeles
People from Tillamook County, Oregon
Philadelphia 76ers draft picks
Philadelphia 76ers players
Phoenix Suns players
Portland Trail Blazers players
Santa Clara Broncos men's basketball players
Seattle SuperSonics players